The twelfth and final season of the American television sitcom The Big Bang Theory premiered on CBS on September 24, 2018. The series returned to its regular Thursday night time slot on September 27, 2018. The season, as well as the series, concluded on May 16, 2019.

Production
In March 2017, CBS renewed the series for two more seasons, bringing its total to twelve and securing that the series would run through the 2018–19 television season. On August 22, 2018, CBS and Warner Bros. Television officially announced that the twelfth season would be the series' last. This stemmed from Jim Parsons' decision to leave the series at the end of season twelve if the show were to have been renewed for a thirteenth season. The series concluded with an hour-long finale consisting of two back-to-back episodes on May 16, 2019.

Cast

Main cast
 Johnny Galecki as Dr. Leonard Hofstadter
 Jim Parsons as Dr. Sheldon Cooper
 Kaley Cuoco as Penny Hofstadter 
 Simon Helberg as Howard Wolowitz
 Kunal Nayyar as Dr. Rajesh "Raj" Koothrappali
 Mayim Bialik as Dr. Amy Farrah Fowler
 Melissa Rauch as Dr. Bernadette Rostenkowski-Wolowitz
 Kevin Sussman as Stuart Bloom

Recurring cast
 Christine Baranski as Dr. Beverly Hofstadter
 Brian Posehn as Dr. Bertram "Bert" Kibbler
 Brian George as Dr. V.M. Koothrappali
 Lauren Lapkus as Denise
 Keith Carradine as Wyatt
 Rati Gupta as Anu
 Bob Newhart as Dr. Arthur Jeffries/Professor Proton
 Joshua Malina as President Siebert
 John Ross Bowie as Dr. Barry Kripke
 Brian Thomas Smith as Zack Johnson
 Lindsey Kraft as Marissa Johnson
 Kal Penn as Dr. Kevin Campbell
 Sean Astin as Dr. Greg Pemberton

Guest cast
 Teller as Larry Fowler
 Kathy Bates as Mrs. Fowler
 Neil deGrasse Tyson as himself
 Bill Nye as himself
 Jerry O'Connell as George Cooper Jr.
 Robert Wu as Tam Nguyen
 Maribeth Monroe as Dr. Lee
 Iain Armitage as Young Sheldon
 Lance Barber as George Cooper Sr.
 Montana Jordan as Young George Cooper Jr.
 Andy Daly as Nathan
 William Shatner as himself
 Wil Wheaton as himself
 Kevin Smith as himself
 Kareem Abdul-Jabbar as himself
 Joe Manganiello as himself
 Ellen DeGeneres as herself
 George Smoot as himself
 Kip Thorne as himself
 Frances H. Arnold as herself
 Regina King as Janine Davis
 Todd Giebenhain as Mitch
 Sarah Michelle Gellar as herself
 Mark Hamill as himself

Episodes

Ratings

Special 
A retrospective, Unraveling the Mystery: A Big Bang Farewell, hosted by Johnny Galecki and Kaley Cuoco, aired at 9:30 P.M. ET/PT, the night of the finale, following the season two finale of Young Sheldon, and the series finale of The Big Bang Theory. The special was also included on the DVD and Blu-Ray releases of the season.

References

External links

 

2018 American television seasons
2019 American television seasons
The Big Bang Theory seasons